William "Speedy" Morris (born April 26, 1942) is an American basketball coach.  

Born in Manayunk, Morris acquired the nickname "Speedy" because he was one of the slowest kids in his neighborhood. Morris started coaching at St. John the Baptist Catholic School's CYO varsity basketball team. He then went on to coach at Roman Catholic High School. Morris was then asked to be head coach of La Salle University's women's basketball team. He was head coach of the La Salle University men's team from 1986 to 2001, where he led the Explorers to four NCAA tournament appearances.  

Morris's 238 wins are the most in school history. His best team was the 1989–90, led by Lionel Simmons and Doug Overton, which posted a 30–2 record and finished 12th in both major polls.

Morris was the first Division I coach to coach both the men's and women's program at the same school. While at La Salle, Morris coached future NBA players Simmons, Overton, Randy Woods, Tim Legler, and Rasual Butler.  However, he was forced to resign in 2001 after eight straight losing seasons.

Soon afterward, Morris was hired at St. Joseph's Preparatory School in Philadelphia. The teams won Catholic League titles in 2002 and 2003. On February 7, 2011, he earned his 561st win in the Philadelphia Catholic League, the most of any coach in league history. On February 3, 2012, Morris earned his 900th win as Prep defeated Roman Catholic, a team he once coached. Morris is the first and only coach in Pennsylvania state history to win 300 games with two schools. He won his 1000th game on January 12, 2018. In December 2019, Morris announced that he would retire at the end of the season. He wanted to continue coaching, but his battle with Parkinson's disease had taken its toll on him.

Head coaching record

College men's

References

1942 births
Living people
American men's basketball coaches
American women's basketball coaches
Basketball coaches from Pennsylvania
High school basketball coaches in Pennsylvania
La Salle Explorers men's basketball coaches
La Salle Explorers women's basketball coaches